An election to Galway County Council took place on 10 June 1999 as part of that year's Irish local elections. 30 councillors were elected from five local electoral areas on the system of proportional representation by means of the single transferable vote (PR-STV) for a five-year term of office.

Results by party

Results by Electoral Area

Ballinasloe

Connemara

Loughrea

Oranmore

Tuam

External links
 Official website

1999 Irish local elections
1999